State Route 723 (SR 723) is a  state highway in Churchill County, Nevada, running through a rural area northwest of Fallon.

Route description

From there, the highway runs northward along Soda Lake Road, a two-lane road through mostly residential and  rural agricultural areas. The highway follows Soda Lake Road due north for about  before reaching its terminus at an intersection with Cox Road, on the southeastern flank of the Soda Lakes volcano.

Near the northern end of SR723 are the Soda Lakes, Soda Lake Geothermal Plant, now-closed Coast Guard LORAN-C transmitter Fallon and some farms around the periphery of Soda Lakes.

History
The alignment of present-day SR 723 appears on maps as early as 1937. However, it was not designated as a state highway until January 1, 1978.

Major intersections

See also

References

723
Transportation in Churchill County, Nevada